The National Defense University (MNDU) is an accredited Mongolian military university located in Ulaanbaatar, Mongolia. Founded in 1921, it is the country's premier and oldest military educational institution. The NDU prepares officers and NCOs alike to have grounded leadership skills, physical and moral strength and a high military and civilian education.

History 
It was established initially as the Commanders School of the Mongolian People's Army in September 1921 at the initiative of Damdin Sükhbaatar, who was a founding member of the Mongolian People's Party (MPP). The first leaders of the school was Soviet expert P. Mhalpinein and director L. Dzuzav, the Mongolian director. The NDU has since operated under the follow names:

Commanders School of the Mongolian People's Army (September 1921 – September 1923)
All-Arms General Military School (September 1923 – May 1932)
General Military Higher School (May 1932 – June 1967)
Combined Military Higher School (1967–1991)
Military University (1990–1999)
Defense University of Mongolia (1999–2017)
National Defense University (since 2017)

In 1994, the MNDU maintained a border protection faculty, which would later be expanded to establish the Border Troops Institute and what would later become the Law Enforcement University of Mongolia. Since 1998, the MNDU's international relations have been intensified, with some cadets at the university studying and/or training at military educational institutions such as the Military University of the Russian Defense Ministry, the United States Army War College, and the Turkish Military Academy.

Structure 
The NDU is composed of the following education institutions:

 Defense Management Academy
 Defense Research Institute
 Academic Education Institute
 Military Institute
 Military Music College
Department of Military Communications and Cyber Security
 NCO College

There are also 16 academic/military branch departments managed by the NDU around the country.

Affiliated military lyceum 
The "Temujin Urlug" Secondary School is a military lyceum of the armed forces. The school was established in 2010 and is the successor to the Sukhbaatar Officer's School, established on 1 October 1943. It currently has 25 teachers and 202 students, and prepares future personnel for the Armed Forces. The school works with the Suvorov Military School in Yekaterinburg and Omsk in Russia, and the Military High School of Bulgaria.

At the invitation of the Mayor of Angarsk, Irkutsk Oblast, students of the school marched in a Victory Day military ceremony in the city.

Honors 
The following is a list of material honors the NDU has:
Honorific title of National Defense University named after Damdin Sükhbaatar
Recipient of the Order of Sukhbaatar
Recipient of the Red Banner Order of Combat Merit

Other than the material honors it has been given, it also has many other honors that are bestowed upon it. Every July, the NDU provides the armed forces standard color guard and the corps of drums in the Mongolian State Flag Day military parade on Sükhbaatar Square. In September 2015, cadets of the NDU took part in the China Victory Day Parade on Beijing's Chang'an Avenue. The NDU holds its graduation ceremony in the presence of the President of Mongolia.

Alumni 

 Dashdemberal Bat-Erdene, Minister of Defense of Mongolia from 2012 to 2014.
 Mishigiin Sonompil, Minister for Defense from January 2006 to December 2007.
Dulamsürengiin Davaa, Chief of General Staff under Presidents Tsakhiagiin Elbegdorj and Khaltmaagiin Battulga.
Ukhnaagiin Khürelsükh, Prime Minister and 6th President of Mongolia.
Gürsediin Saikhanbayar, Minister of Defense of Mongolia since 2020.
Badmaanyambuugiin Bat-Erdene, a Mongolian politician and athlete.
Batchimeg Migeddorj, former national security advisor and member of parliament.

References

External links

Military of Mongolia
Military academies
1921 establishments in Mongolia
Universities in Mongolia